Chinna (born Arugunta Jithendra Reddy) is an Indian actor and director, known for his works predominantly in Telugu cinema, Bollywood and Television.
He made his Telugu film debut with Ram Gopal Varma's Siva in 1989. His debut movie as hero is Kalyanamaala (1997).

Early life
Chinna was born in Vakadu, Nellore, Andhra Pradesh in 1965.

Awards
Vamsi Berkley Awards
Best Actor - Allari Pilla (1992).

Filmography

As actor

Films 
 Malli Malli Idi Rani Roju (2015)
 Kalyanam (2009)
 Aa Intlo (2009) as Pavan
 18,20 Love Story (2009)
 Satyameva Jayate (2009)
 Okka Magadu (2008)
 Mee Sreyobhilashi (2007) as Ramakrishna
 Kunkuma (2005)
 Seenu Vasanthi Lakshmi (2004)
 Ninne Ishtapaddanu (2003) as Boney's relative
 Kabaddi Kabaddi (2003) as Mad man
 Anveshana (2002)
 Sontham (2002) as Shesham's friend
 Bachi (2000)
 Life Lo Wife (1998)
 Kalyanamaala (1997)
 Alluda Majaka (1995) as Siva
 Aunty (1995)
 Rendo Krishnudu (1995)
 Money Money (1994) as Bose
 Kishkinda Kanda (1994)
 Money (1993) as Bose
 Raat (1992)
 Allari Pilla (1992) as Photographer Nethranandham
Lathi (1992)
 Chaitanya (1991) as Journalist Sudhakar
 Aatma Bandham (1991)
 Madhura Nagarilo (1991)
 Puttinti Pattu Cheera (1990)
 Siva (1989) as Chinna

Television 

 Naga Bhairavi (Telugu; 2020–present) as Veerabhadram

References

Telugu male actors
Living people
Indian male comedians
People from Nellore
Male actors from Andhra Pradesh
Indian male film actors
Male actors in Telugu cinema
Male actors in Hindi cinema
20th-century Indian male actors
21st-century Indian male actors
1965 births
Indian male television actors
Male actors in Telugu television
Telugu comedians